Beginning in the late 2000s, the United States Military has supported the Federal Government of Somalia in counterterrorism as part of the ongoing Global War on Terror that began in wake of the September 11th attacks. Support, mostly in the form of drone and airstrikes, advising, training, and intelligence, increased during the Obama administration and Trump administration, with hundreds of drone strikes targeting the terrorist group al-Shabaab. Two U.S. special operations personnel and a CIA paramilitary officer have died during operations in Somalia.

In late 2020, US President Donald Trump announced that he would pull most US troops out of Somalia by 15 January 2021. On January 17, 2021, the US Military announced that its troop drawdown had completed. Training of allied forces, limited airstrikes, and special operations activity continues.

In May 2022, according to a government spokesman, President Joe Biden has accepted a request from the Pentagon to redeploy US soldiers to Somalia in order to combat the terrorist group Al-Shabaab.

US airstrikes on Somalia

Since 2007, the United States military has targeted militant groups, mainly Al-Shabaab, within Somalia using airstrikes including targeted drone strikes and missiles launched from naval ships alongside special forces raids and advising. Airstrikes were ramped up dramatically under the Trump administration and further targeting the Islamic State.

According to Robert Moore, a public policy advisor, there is a  school called Responsibility to Protect (R2P) that demands "military force should be used for humanitarian purposes, especially in mass-casualty conflicts,” which he suggests as a reason for the United States' intervention in Somalia.

Timeline

2007
US forces conducted three strikes in Somalia during 2007 killing a minimum of 21 people including two civilians.
 January 7
A U.S. Air Force AC-130 gunship operating under JSOC targeted a suspected al-Qaeda convoy. The strike killed various potential fighters including Fazul Abdullah Mohammed, and Sudanese explosive expert Abu Talha al Sudani known as Tariq Abdullah. The convoy had been tracked at night by a MQ-1 Predator drone. An estimated 5–10 militants were killed and 4-5 injured. A joint U.S.–Ethiopian team landed at the strike location shortly after and confirmed at least 8 killed. According to the U.S. Department of Defense, the militants killed in this strike were connected to the 1998 embassy bombings in Kenya and Tanzania.

 January 9
Four towns near the southern city of Ras Kamboni were targeted by an AC-130 gunship. The strike which was targeting a training camp and al-Qaeda associates, reportedly left 4–31 people killed. The intended target was thought to be Fazul Abdullah Mohammed, the target of a previous airstrike. Another strike was reported near Afmadow in which 22–31 people were reported killed.
 January 23
At 4:00 a.m., an AC-130 gunship operating from an airbase in eastern Ethiopia, targeted the town of Waldena in an attempt to kill Ahmed Madobe. Madobe survived the airstrike but was later captured by American and Ethiopian forces who landed by helicopter at 10:00 a.m.
 June 1
The USS Chafee fired a dozen rounds and possibly one cruise missile on the coast of Bargal, in northern Somalia. The strikes were targeting 35 militants that had landed on the coast and had begun to fire on local forces. U.S. officials told The New York Times that U.S. operatives were on the ground, leading to the American warship firing in self-defense. 8–12 militants, including some foreign fighters were killed.

2008
 March 3
1–3 cruise missiles were launched by United States at the town of Dhobley in southern Somalia, four miles from the Kenyan border. The strike was targeting the leader of the Ras Kamboni Brigades known as Hassan Turki, and al-Qaeda member Saleh Ali Saleh Nabhan. At the time, Saleh Alii was the subject of a $25 million bounty placed on him by the United States government.
 May 1
Four cruise missiles launched by a U.S. Navy warship struck a compound in Dhusamareb, in central Somalia. The strike killed senior al-Shabaab leader Aden Hashi Ayro and several other fighters. Reports suggest that an AC-130 was also involved in the operation. The attack purportedly caused al-Shabaab to ban the use of mobile phones by its fighters.

2009
 September 14
Operation Celestial Balance  – After several strikes by warplanes, U.S. commandos launch a helicopter raid near the southern coastal town of Barawa, killing Saleh Ali Saleh Nabhan after his convoy was tracked as it left Mogadishu to attend a meeting between Islamic militants.

2011
 April 3–6
During fighting in Dhobley between Somali forces and al-Shabaab militants, an airstrike took place which killed al-Qaeda commander Jabreel Malik Muhammed. This followed an eighteen month long gap in U.S. strikes in the area.
 June 23
In the first reported lethal drone strike conducted in Somalia, U.S. forces struck a training camp south of Kismayo, which supposedly resulted in the death of senior al Shabaab leader, Ibrahim al-Afghani. However, Stratfor reported in August that Afghani was still alive and had replaced Ahmed Abdi Godane as the emir of al-Shabaab. Afghani has not appeared in the public since.
 July 6
Early in the morning, U.S. drones hit three al-Shabaab training camps in Afmadow. It was not confirmed if the United States was responsible for the attack.
 September 15
Three explosions are heard after Kismayo residents reported aircraft flying over the town. Residents report the aircraft having struck at a forested area where militants are believed to have established a training camp. The aircraft are most likely American warplanes.
 September 25
Series of drone strikes target al-Shabaab militant in Kismayo.
 October 6
Drone strike targets al-Shabaab militants who were retreating into Dolbiyow Village. The attack killed 4 Somali farmers.
 October 13
Drone strike against an al Shabaab base near Tabda village.
 October 22
US drone attacked on Afmadow.
 October 23
US and French airstrikes in Kismayo.

2012
 January 21
Three missiles fired by a drone target and kill the British–Lebanese militant Bilal al-Berjawi known as Abu Hafsa while he is driving in a car outside Mogadishu.
 February 24
US drone strike targeting a vehicle carrying a senior commander kills 7 militants in Lower Shabelle, including a prominent Moroccan, and a deputy of Bilah al-Berjawi.
 August 23
US airstrikes reportedly conducted into the town of Qandala.

2013
 October 28
2 Islamists killed in drone attack including senior al-Shabaab leader Ibrahim Ali Abdi.

2014
 September 1
US drones and conventional aircraft target al-Shabaab encampments and vehicles. Leader Ahmed Abdi Godane was killed in the strike.
 December 29
US drone strike kills senior leader of al-Shabaab known as Abdishakur, the group's intelligence chief.

2015
 January 31
45-60 al-Shabaab members are reported killed in a US drone strike in Lower Shabelle, after explosions rock a training camp, a house, and several armored vehicles. The U.S. denies its involvement in the strikes. It is the most lethal American attack in Somalia against radical Islamists to date.

In a second strike, senior al-Shabaab leader Yusef Dheeq and an associate are killed while riding in a vehicle.
 March 10
US drones target two al-Shabaab training camps.
 March 12
Adan Garaar, senior member of al-Shabaab and suspect in the Kenyan Westgate shopping mall attack, is killed in drone strike that destroyed two vehicles.
 July 15–18
Drone strikes in Bardera.
 November 22
US strike targets an al-Shabaab base in southern Somalia.
 November 29
Either Kenyan or American planes bomb 3 villages in central Hiraan.
 December 2
Senior al-Shabaab fighter Abdirahman Sandhere (Ukash) killed in airstrike.
 December 22
al-Shabaab leader Abu Ubaidah killed in drone strike.

2016
US forces conducted 15 airstrikes in Somalia during 2016
 March 5
A massive U.S. airstrike involving multiple aircraft, manned and unmanned, targeted a training camp near the town of Raso (Buloburde District) killing an estimated 150 al-Shabaab militants. According to U.S. military officials, the American warplanes struck a large gathering of fighters as they were massing in preparation for an attack.
 March 8
US helicopter assist Somali Special Forces who had attacked an al-Shabaab target in southern Somalia.
 March 31
US drone strike target 3 al-Shabaab vehicles in southern Somalia.
 April 1
US airstrikes against al-Shabaab militants.
 April 2
2 US strikes leave 6 people killed in southern Somalia.
 April 6 
US drone strike in Jilib leaves 8 people dead.
 April 11
US drone strike attacks an al-Shabaab camp in southern Somalia killing 12 militants.
 May 9–10
The United States, alongside Kenyan and Somali forces, conducted a raid in Toratorow. It is reported that helicopters were also used in the raid. 
 May 12
US airstrike kills 5 al-Shabaab members.
 May 27
Senior al-Shabaab leader Abdullahi Haji Daud killed in drone strike.
 June 11
Reportedly, US jets struck al Shabaab targets in the northern autonomous region of Puntland.
 June 21
3 al-Shabaab members killed in drone strike.
 August 30
Two militants are killed in drone strike near Gobanale.
 September 5
Four militants are killed near the town of Tortoroow, in two "self-defense" strikes.
 September 26
U.S. officials say four al-Shabaab fighters were killed by airstrikes after they attacked a joint U.S.-Somali force near Kismayo.
 September 28
U.S. aircraft mistakenly target local militia members in the Puntland region, killing at least 22 Galmudug soldiers, as well as some Islamist fighters. The strike led to demonstrations in Galkayo that saw protesters burn the American flag.

2017 
US forces conducted 35 airstrikes in Somalia during 2017
 January 7 
Self defense strike against AL-Shabaab militants in Gaduud. No fatalities 
 May 5
A US Navy Seal was killed and three others wounded including a Somali-American interpreter during a raid in Barii. Four to eight Al-Shabaab militants were killed in the raid. It would be the first time a US service member died by combat in Somalia since 1993
 June 11 
Airstrike killed eight Al-Shabaab militants 185 miles Southwest of Mogadishu 
July 2
Kinetic strike killed one Al-Shabaab militant in Lower Shabelle region.
 July 5 
Self defense strike 300 miles Southwest of Mogadishu killed 13 Al-Shabaab militants and wounded 10 more. The strike came after a Somali military base was attacked.
 July 29
Kinetic strike killed one Al-Shabaab fighter later identified as Ali Muhammad in Southern Somalia. 
 August 10 
US forces conducted two kinetic strikes killing unknown
 August 16–17 
Three defense strikes killed seven Al-Shabaab militants 200 miles Southwest of Mogadishu. The strikes were called in after US and Somali special forces were fired upon while conducting a counter terrorism operation. Reports stated that seven civilians had been killed by warplanes in Jilib. AFRICOM denied the allegations and called the reports "unreliable".
 August 25
US and Somali commandoes reportedly killed 10 unarmed civilians including three children and a woman during a raid. The Somali Army admitted to mistakenly killing the civilians. Africa Command denied the casualty allegations stating that only enemy combatants were killed in the raid.
 August 31
Drone strike near Barawe killed an Al-Shabaab and injured one other fighter.
 September 5 
Precision strike killed three Al-Shabaab militants in Central Somalia
 September 7 
Precision strike killed one Al-Shabbab militant 
 September 13
Three precision airstrikes killed six Al-Shabaab militants in Southern Somalia
 November 3
Up to 20 ISIS fighters killed by airstrikes in Puntland, Northeastern Somalia. It is believed to have been the first time the US targeted the Islamic State in Somalia 
 November 9 
Several Al-Shabaab militants killed by an airstrike in Southern Somalia
 November 10
US airstrike killed up to 13 Al-Shabaab militants according to Somali official in Lower Shabelle
 November 11
One Al-Shabaab fighter killed by airstrike near Gaduud
 November 14
Several Al-Shabaab militants killed by airstrike 60 miles Northwest of Mogadishu 
November 9–14
Airstrikes killed up to 40 militants per United States Africa Command 
 November 21
Airstrike targeting an Al-Shabaab training camp killed over 100 militants 125 miles Northwest of Mogadishu
 November 27 
One ISIS fighter killed by airstrike in Northeastern Somalia 
 December 12
Airstrike destroyed a vehicle-borne improvised explosive device 65 kilometers Southwest of Mogadishu
 December 15
Airstrike killed eight Al-Shabaab fighters and destroyed one vehicle 30 miles Northwest of Mogadishu 
 December 24
Airstrike in Southern Somalia killed 13 Al-Shabaab militants
 December 27 
Airstrike killed four Al-Shabaab militants and destroyed one vehicle-borne improvised explosive device, 25 kilometers west of Mogadishu

2018 
US forces conducted 47 airstrikes in Somalia during 2018, killing between 326 and 338 people
 January 2
Airstrike killed two Al-Shabaab militants and destroyed one vehicle-borne explosive 50 kilometers West of Mogadishu 
 January 18
Airstrike killed four Al-Shabaab militants 50 kilometers Northwest of Kismayo
 February 19
Airstrike killed three Al-Shabaab militants in Jilib 
 February 21
Airstrike killed five Al-Shabaab militants in Jamaame
 February 26
Airstrike killed two Al-Shabaab militants and wounded one in Jilib 
March 13
Airstrike in Jamecco killed 12 Al-Shabaab militants and injured 15. 
 March 19
Airstrike against Al-Shabaab militants killed two, wounded three, and destroyed one vehicle in near Mubaarak 
 April 1
Airstrike near El Burr killed four Al-Shabaab militants and two civilians. It would be the first time the US Military would acknowledge civilians deaths in Somalia.
 April 5 
Airstrike near jilib killed three Al-Shabaab militants and destroyed one vehicle 
 April 11
Airstrike destroyed an Al-Shabaab vehicle-borne explosive device near Jana Cabdalle
 May 23
Airstrike killed 10 Al-Shabaab militants 15 miles Southwest of Mogadishu 
 May 31
Airstrike killed 12 Al-Shabaab militants 30 miles Southeast of Mogadishu
 June 2 
Airstrike killed 27 Al-Shabaab militants 26 miles Southwest of Bosasso
 June 8
One US soldier killed, four wounded and one partner force wounded in Al-Shabaab mortar attack in Jubaland
 August 2
Four Al-Shabaab militants killed by airstrike 74 miles Northwest of Mogadishu
 August 21
Airstrike killed two Al-Shabaab militants 46 kilometers Northeast of Kismayo 
 August 27
Three Al-Shabaab militants killed by airstrike 40 kilometers Southwest of Mogadishu 
 September 11 
Two Al-Shabaab militants killed and one wounded by airstrike in Mubaraak
 September 21
Airstrike killed 18 Al-Shabaab militants 50 kilometers Northwest of Kismayo 
 October 1 
Nine Al-Shabaab militants killed and one wounded by airstrike 40 kilometers Northwest of Kismayo  
 October 6 
Airstrike kills one Al-Shabaab militant in Kunyo Barrow
 October 12
Airstrike in Harardere killed around 60 Al-Shabaab militants. It was the largest strike in Somalia since November 2017
 October 14
Self-defense strike killed four Al-Shabaab militants in Araara
 October 25
Airstrike killed two Al-Shabaab militants and wounded one in Kunyo Barrow
 November 3
Self-defense strike killed four Al-Shabaab militants in Araara

 November 19
Two airstrikes killed 37 Al-Shabaab militants and destroy one training camp in Debatscile These strikes put the number of US airstrikes in Somalia to 31 during the year 2018.
 November 20
Airstrike in Quy Cad killed seven Al-Shabaab militants
 November 21
Airstrike in Harardhere killed six Al-Shabaab militants. A second strike would destroy an Al-Shabaab weapons cache in Harardhere
 November 27
Airstrike in Debatscile (Hobyo District) killed three Al-Shabaab militants
 November 30 
Airstrike killed nine Al-Shabaab militants near Lebede (Burhakaba District)
 December 4
Self-defense strike killed four Al-Shabaab militants in Awdheegle
 December 9
Self-defense strike killed four Al-Shabaab militants in Basra
 December 15
Four airstrikes in Gondershe targeting camp and vehicles killed 34 Al-Shabaab militants
 December 16
Two airstrikes in Gandarshe kill 28 Al-Shabaab militants
 December 19
Two airstrikes in Beled Amin killed 11 Al-Shabaab militants

2019
US forces have conducted a record of more than 60 airstrikes in Somalia during 2019, killing 913–1,011 Al-Shabaab militants
 January 2
Airstrike killed 10 Al-Shabaab militants in Dheerow Sanle (Dinsoor District)
 January 7
Two self-defense strikes killed four Al-Shabaab militants in Baqdaad
 January 8
Airstrike killed six Al-Shabaab militants and destroyed one vehicle in Yaaq Braawe, Bay Region
 January 19 
Airstrike targeted a large group of Al-Shabaab fighters attacking Somali National Army troops near Jilib killing 52 militants
 January 23
Two airstrikes were conducted in Jilib with at least one Al-Shabaab militant killed. Africa Command also announced that it would no longer release casualty details from its operations with journalist and news agency's having to refer to the Somali Government for casualty details. They would later undo the decision.
 January 30
Airstrike on an Al-Shabaab encampment in the vicinity of Shebeeley in the Hiran Region killed 24 militants
 February 1
Airstrike in the village of Gandarshe in the Lower Shebelle Region killed 13 Al-Shabaab militants
 February 6
Airstrike in the vicinity of Gandarshe in the Lower Shabelle Region killed 11 Al-Shabaab militants
 February 7 
Airstrike in the vicinity of Bariire (Afgooye District) killed four Al-Shabaab militants
 February 8
Airstrike in Kobon near Kismayo killed eight Al-Shabaab militants
 February 11
Two airstrikes in Janaale, Lower Shabelle Region killed 12 Al-Shabaab militants. The first strike killed eight while the second killed four. The strikes were executed as Somali forces were conducting an operation in the region an AFRICOM press release stated. Al-Shabaab claimed that the strikes hit civilian homes but did not give a casualty number.
 February 23
US forces conducted four airstrikes, two were conducted in Qunyo Barrow (Jilib District) and two were conducted in Awdheegle and near Janalle. The strikes targeted Al-Shabaab facilities and checkpoints and killed two militants according to an AFRICOM press release. Al-Shabaab claimed that one of the strikes killed a 20-day-old baby and his father.
 February 24
Airstrike targeted Al-Shabaab militants 23 miles East of Beledweyne in the Hiran Region. The strike killed 35 militants who were "transitioning between locations" according to an AFRICOM press release.
February 25
Airstrike near Shebeeley in the Hiran Region killed 20 Al-Shabaab militants
February 28
Airstrike in the Hiran Region killed 26 Al-Shabaab militants bringing the number of airstrikes in Somalia conducted by US forces during 2019 to 24.
March 11
Somali soldiers and US advisors were fired upon in Darasalam, Qoriyoley District, a self-defense strike in response would kill eight Al-Shabaab militants. No US or Somali soldiers were harmed
March 12
Airstrike in Huley, Burhakaba District, killed two Al-Shabaab militants
March 13
Self-Defence strike in support of Somali National Security Forces in Malayle, Lower Juba Region, killed three Al-Shabaab militants according to an AFRICOM press release.
 April 14
Airstrike managed to kill Abdulhakim Dhuqub, a high ranking ISIS-Somalia official, near Xiriiro, Iskushuban District.
 July 27
A militant that AFRICOM believed to play a valuable role in the Islamic State in Somalia group was killed during an airstrike in the Golis Mountains of Puntland.
 August 20
Airstrike in the vicinity of Qunyo Barrow, Jilib District, killing one terrorist.
 October 1
Airstrike killed nine suspected militants and injured another, after al-Shabaab attacked Somali government forces about 40 kilometers northeast of Kismayo in Lower Juba Province.
 October 6
Airstrike near Qunyo Barrow, Jilib District, killing one terrorist.
 October 25
Airstrike targeted Islamic militants near Ameyra, south of Bosaso, which killed three of their leaders.
 November 19
Airstrike near Qunyo Barrow, Jilib District killing one terrorist.
 December 16
Airstrike in Dujuuma, Bu'ale District, killing one terrorist.
 December 30
Airstrikes, in the villages of Qunyo Barrow (Jilib District) and Aliyow Barrow (Balcad district), killed four Al-Shabaab militants and destroyed two vehicles, following the Mogadishu bombing.

2020
As of April 2020, US forces have conducted 32 airstrikes in Somalia.
 February
A U.S. airstrike killed Bashir Mohamed Mahamoud, also known by the alias Bashir Qorgab, who was a military commander of al-Shabaab on 22 February in Saakow, Middle Juba region. The Rewards for Justice used to offer a $5 million reward for information that brings him to justice since 2008.

Another airstrike killed an employee of the telecoms Hormuud Telecom. It was aimed at al-Shabaab in Jilib, Middle Juba.

 March
A press release from the U.S. Africa Command indicates that an airstrike was carried out near Janaale that killed five terrorists without any civilian casualties. However, a news outlet spoke with residents of Janaale who indicated that a 13-year-old boy and an elderly disabled man were killed on the attack, wherein a missile struck a mini-bus. A member of the Somali Parliament, Mahad Dore, confirmed the attack and that civilians were killed. After Amnesty International accused the US military of providing no accountability for civilian victims of airstrikes, Africom's commander announced on March 31 that quarterly reports detailing civilian death allegations would be included in the future, along with investigation progress of those claims. An Airwars spokesperson responded by saying that militaries conduct post-strike investigations from the air with few ground assessments.

 April
A U.S. airstrike killed three extremists including a senior leader, Yusuf Jiis, near Bush Madina in the Bay region on 2 April. Another airstrike killed five al-Shabab members near Jilib on 6 April.

 August
Somalian authorities mentioned that a U.S. drone strike killed a high-ranking member of al-Shabab, Abdel Kader Othman, near the southwestern town of Kurtunwarey (Kurtunwarey District).

September
A U.S. Military advisor was injured and three Somali special forces personal were killed during an al-Shabab vehicle-borne and mortar attack on a U.S. and Somali partner force in the vicinity of Jana Cabdalle (Afmadow District) on September 7.

December

President Donald Trump ordered the Department of Defense to remove the majority of the 700 U.S. military troops in Somalia from the country in December 2020.

2021
 January 17
U.S. Africa Command affirms that the United States has completed its troop withdrawal from Somalia.

 January 19
Airstrikes in Jamaame and Deb Scinnele (Wanlaweyn District) killed three al-Shabaab militants

 July 20
The U.S. carried out its first airstrike in Somalia under the Biden administration against al-Shabaab militants near Galkayo.

 July 23
The U.S. military conducted an airstrike against al-Shabaab militants near Galmudug.

 August 1
The U.S. military conducted an airstrike in the vicinity of Qeycad (Harardhere District) targeted al-Shabaab militants who were engaging members of the Danab.

 August 24
U.S. Africa Command conducted an airstrike against al-Shabaab fighters engaged in active combat with Somali forces.

2022

 February 23 and 24

U.S. Africa Command conducted an airstrike against al-Shabaab terrorists after they attacked Somali forces in a remote location near Duduble (Wanlaweyn District) on February 22.

 May 17

President Biden approved Pentagon's request to redeploy US Troops in Somalia. The official said that "under 500" troops will be sent back to the country.

 July 17

U.S Africa Command conducted an airstrike against al-Shabaab terrorists, killing two, after they "attacked partner forces in a remote location near Libikus, Somalia."

August 9
U.S Africa Command conducted an airstrike against al-Shabaab terrorists who "attacked Somali National Army Forces near Beledweyne, Somalia."

August 14
U.S Africa Command conducted an airstrike against al-Shabaab terrorists near Teedaan, Somalia to support Somali troops carrying out military operations against Al Shabaab in Hiran region, killing 13 Al Shabaab fighters. It was soon afterwards reported that the Somali National Army successfully captured Al Shabaab's biggest base, which was located in the region.

September 18
Airstrike near Buulobarde kills 27 al-Shabaab terrorists attacking Somali National Army forces. The defensive strikes allowed the Somali National Army and African Union Transition Mission in Somalia forces to regain the initiative and continue the operation to disrupt al-Shabaab in the Hiraan region of central Somalia. This operation against al-Shabaab is reported to be the largest combined Somali and ATMIS offensive operation in five years.

October 1
U.S. drone strike near the coastal town of Haramka, located near Jilib. Strike kills senior al-Shabaab leader Abdullah Yare. Prior to his death, Yare had a $3 million bounty. At the time of his death, he was also in line to succeed ailing al-Shabaab leader Ahmed Diriye.

October 26
U.S. airstrike kills two al-Shabaab jihadis in Buloburde, Hiran, according to the United States Africa Command; they were attacking Somali soldiers.

2023

 January 26
A U.S. military raid in northern Somalia killed senior Islamic State member Bilal al-Sudani and ten other insurgents. No U.S. military casualties were reported in the operation, which was ordered by U.S. President Joe Biden.

 February 12

According to the US Africa Command, 12 al-Shabaab members were killed 472 kilometers northeast of Mogadishu. No civilian deaths or wounds were reported in the conflict. Last year the Pentagon asked Biden to depart US troops to Somalia for fighting against the al-Shabaab terrorist group. With Biden's approval, US troops appeared in the region.

Casualties
By August 2022, Airwars estimated that 78-153 civilians were killed by US airstrikes in Somalia since 2007, including 20-23 children, 12-13 women, and 79 named victims. The US has acknowledged only 5 civilian deaths in Somalia. American strikes also injured 34-49 civilians.

See also 

War in Somalia
Operation Ocean Shield
Operation Enduring Freedom – Horn of Africa
Drone strikes in Pakistan, Afghanistan, Yemen and Libya
 Timeline of United States military operations

References

Further reading 
 Brendon J. Cannon (2020) "What’s in it for us? Armed drone strikes and the security of Somalia’s Federal Government." Small Wars & Insurgencies, 31:4, 773–800, DOI: 10.1080/09592318.2020.1743489

Somali Civil War (2009–present)
Somalia
21st-century military history of the United States
Somalia–United States relations